Ni ke Dre, is an anonymous Greek sousta.

Original form

The original form of the sousta was a popular folk dance in Amorgos.

See also
Sousta

References

External links

Greek songs
Greek dances
Songwriter unknown
Year of song unknown